The State-of-the-Art Reactor Consequence Analyses (SOARCA) is a study of nuclear power plant safety conducted by the Nuclear Regulatory Commission.  The purpose of the SOARCA is assessment of possible impact on population caused by major radiation accidents that might occur at NPPs. This new study updates older studies with the latest state-of-the-art computer models and incorporates new plant safety and security enhancements.

History

Older studies
WASH-740 (1957)
WASH-1400 (1975)
CRAC-II  (1982)
NUREG-1150 (1991)

See also

Incident response team
Nuclear power
Nuclear power debate
Nuclear safety in the U.S.
Nuclear safety systems
Nuclear fuel response to reactor accidents
Nuclear accidents in the United States

External links
SOARCA Website

References

Nuclear safety and security
Nuclear Regulatory Commission